Bahir Dar is the capital of Amhara Region in Ethiopia. 

Bahir Dar is one of the leading tourist destinations in Ethiopia with a variety of attractions in the nearby Lake Tana and Blue Nile river. The city is distinctly known for its 'wide avenues lined with palm trees and a variety of colourful flowers.'

The historical development of the city has begun around the 14th century following the establishment of Kidanemihret church at the present sites of St. George church. Considering its adjacency to Lake Tana and Abay river it was named Bahir Dar which means near to the sea, during the reign of Emperor Yikunoamlak.

Account from travellers
Bahir Dar has been home to various monasteries around the Amhara region. Its location at the source of the Blue Nile as well as its situation along the highway was linked to a long-distance trade route that linked northern and southern Ethiopia and gave importance to the city, allowing it to be frequently visited by European travellers. In the 19th century, several European travelers visited the city. The first document about the town was written by Alexandria Edouard Blondeel, a Belgian consul who visited the area in 1842. He referred to the city as a small village.

The second written document is by French traveller Antoine D'Abbadie who visited it a year later. His brother Arnaud D'Abbadie also made a similar visit, with both calling Bahir Dar a town. Walter Plowden, a British envoy to Ethiopia, made similar visits in the mid-1840s. Unlike the two brothers, he described Bahir Dar as a rich local market where grains were exchanged for salt. Moreover, Plowden called Bahir Dar a "town" and its people "town people".  

D'Abbadie brothers and Plowden entered Bahir Dar via reed boat; the former across the outlet of the Blue Nile and the latter across the lake itself. At the time, both observed political unrest between Ras Ali II of Begemder and Beru Goshu of Gojjam over the possession of the locality of Bahir Dar. This shows the importance of the city for Begemder and Gojjam by trade linking both land and water. 

Due to growing trade, it was also visited by Italian travellers Carlo Piaggia and Mario Alamanni. Piaggia lived in Qorat'a from 1873 to 1874 while Alamanni visited Bahir Dar in 1889. Piaggia noted that Bahir Dar was located south of Gojjam, which had controlled the passage of trade at the mouth of the lake. Likewise, Alamanni viewed Bahir Dar among the principal community centers as well as Gondar, Yifag, Daria, Qorat'a in the north and Debre Werq, Dima, Bure, Debre Markos and Basso in the south. Alamanni, unlike predecessor travellers, estimated the population of Bahir Dar in each local market center, which he thought to consist of 1,200 and 1,600 inhabitants.

1850s–1920
Bahir Dar became noticeable from the mid-1850s via local accounts. In 1856, Emperor Tewodros II visited Bahir Dar on his return from Shewan campaigns. It was also said that he left Bahir Dar for Begemder ten years later, crossing the Blue Nile at Eger Bar. Likewise, Menelik II passed from Begemder to Shewa via Bahir Dar a number of times. He was said to have received it from local clergymen. In conclusion, both native and foreign accounts confirmed the city to be strategically important. However, not as local literature, mentioned the economic or social activities of the settlement as external sources.

By the late 20th century, the interest of European powers in Ethiopia grew rapidly. The British and Italians wanted to absorb the trade linkage with their respective territories of Sudan and Eritrea, especially the British wanted the Lake Tana area more than other powers. They sought to construct a barrage at the outlet of the lake in order to develop the economy of Anglo-Egyptian Sudan territory. Thus, they sent various teams for studying Bahir Dar information. The first British expedition to Bahir Dar took place in 1902 led by M.C. Dupuis and his companion A.J. Hayes. Dupuis noted that the church Kidus Giyorgis was constructed with stone and lime while Hayes called the settlement a village. Moreover, Hayes accounts for the life of inhabitants such as the cultivation of grain and fishing in the shallow waters of the Blue Nile were popular agricultural activities. Some people were undergoing their income by transporting people, goods, and pack animals across the Blue Nile across Begemder–Gojjam route via Kanfaro Abbay, along the mouth of the river from Lake Tana.

1920–1941
The most authentic information was observed by the expedition in Lake Tana of the Grabham and Black mission (1920–21) from Britain. They saw local people grow maize, while wheat and barley were brought to the Bahir Dar market from the surrounding highland plateau.

The Grabham and Black mission also observed a large degree of trade activity at Bahir Dar, with people from large distances migrating to its markets. In 1924, the Ethiopian government ordered the construction of a dam by the British across the outlet of Lake Tana. This was the time of modernization in Ethiopia; the dam was expected to become an important means of generating revenue.

Road construction was controversial; while the Ethiopian government idealized road construction between Bahir Dar with Addis Ababa via Debre Markos, the British wanted to link Bahir Dar with Sudan. The Ethiopian government did not agree because it was not supportive to centralize with Addis Ababa. The Ethiopian government also acknowledged the importance of road construction between Addis Ababa and Bahir Dar to enable dam building without external support. 

In 1935, road construction was halted due to the Italian occupation. In May 1936, the Italian troops captured Bahir Dar. They found that Bahir Dar was under monastic influence and decided to develop Bahir Dar with urban measures concurrent to Gondar, Dessie, Adwa, and similar cities. They decided to make it a military base and later the civil administrative center of the whole southern region of Lake Tana, including the former autonomous Gojjam territories of Mecha, Yilmana Densa and Achefer.

In order to obtain full control, the Italians established a new town administration called the Residenza. This urban administration was granted full legal rights to raise revenues by taxing the locality of Bahir Dar and its market. The measure created drastic changes in the relationship between the landlords (balabbats) and tenants and the monastery administration. The policy was a reversal of the previous government and the Italian granted civil administration to the town and they could not pay tax or take advantage of the monastery administration. Conversely, the landlords and their tenants were forced to pay tax for residences. 

The Italians developed Bahir Dar with modernized urban planning that superimposed the older structures and buildings. The land was allocated for different purposes such as administrative offices, army barracks, an airstrip, and port facilities on the lake shore new residential and commercial zones became emerging. Furthermore, they also developed a sewage system and transportation primarily linking Lake Tana area, Zege, Qorat'a, Dagi, and Gorgora. The Gorgora-Bahir Dar line was the principal trade supply between Gondar and Bahir Dar.

1941–present
Bahir Dar was raised to a municipality in 1945. The head of the town administration was the Town Chief (shum), who was the chief secretary of the office of the woreda. Since then, Bahir Dar also behaved municipal structure that neither modeled the older system nor the Italian plan. Since then, the government imposed authority on the monastery leadership of Bahir Dar Giyorgis, entitling them to tax collection over the wider region of Abakabot. Landlords (balabbats) paid tax over estates to the monastery as they did before the Italian occupation.  

Between the 1950s and 1960s, Bahir Dar was continuing urbanization, despite opposition from balabbats and clergy. At around 1950, Bahir Dar was considered a new capital of the Ethiopian Empire and made confusion in the local land market, with consequent vast inflation in local land values. In 1956, Bahir Dar reinstated the recession, at this time being made a province and Shambala Aemiro Silas Ababa appointed as governor.  

During the Ethiopian Civil War, in May 1988, the 603rd corp of the Third Revolutionary (TLA) made its headquarters at Bahir Dar. On 3–4 March 1990, the TLA abandoned Bahir Dar, blowing up a nearby bridge to stop the TPLF/EPRDF advance to occupy the city. On 23 February 1991, the Ethiopian People's Revolutionary Democratic Front (EPRDF) took control of the city as part of Operation Tewedros. Since the 1990s, the city grew as an industrial zone, received numerous investments, and became the capital of Amhara Region.   

On 6–9 February 2007, the city hosted a National Investment Bazaar and Trade Fair to honor Millennium celebrations. On 22 June 2019, the Amhara Region coup d'état attempt was embroiled with coordinated assassinations of Amhara government officials in Bahir Dar and Addis Ababa. Victims of the assassination were the President of Amhara Region Ambachew Mekonnen, advisor Ezez Wassie, General Se'are Mekonnen along with his aide Gizae Aberra, and Amhara Region Attorney General Migbaru Kebede. On 24 June, the state media announced that General Asamnew Tsige was shot dead in Bahir Dar.

Sources
Early History of Bahir Dar Town: c.1900-1941

References

Amhara Region